Ahmed Mahmoud Aly (born 12 September 1945) is an Egyptian boxer. He competed in the men's light heavyweight event at the 1972 Summer Olympics. He was also entered in the heavyweight tournament at the 1976 Montreal Olympics, but was given a walkover loss when he did not appear for his opening  bout.

References

External links
 

1945 births
Living people
Egyptian male boxers
Olympic boxers of Egypt
Boxers at the 1972 Summer Olympics
Place of birth missing (living people)
Light-heavyweight boxers
20th-century Egyptian people